Department of Science and Technology may refer to:
Department of Science and Technology (Australia), an Australian Government department between November 1980 and December 1984
Department of Science and Technology (India)
Department of Science and Technology (Philippines)
Department of Science and Technology (South Africa)

See also
Directorate for Science and Technology (disambiguation)